Mansaka (Mansaka: Minansaka) is an Austronesian language of Mindanao in the Philippines. It may be intelligible with Mandaya.

Mansaka is spoken in western Baganga, and into central-west Davao de Oro province, continuing south back into Davao Oriental Province as far south as Pujada Bay.

References

Further reading

 
 

Mansakan languages
Languages of Davao del Norte
Languages of Davao de Oro
Languages of Davao del Sur